Alan Trewick (27 April 1941 – June 1993) was an English footballer who played as a centre-forward.

Trewick scored 3 goals in 11 league and cup appearances for Gateshead (then of the Football League Fourth Division) during the 1959–60 season. He also played non-league football for Gateshead and North Shields.

Sources

English National Football Archive

1941 births
1993 deaths
English footballers
Association football forwards
Gateshead F.C. players
North Shields F.C. players
English Football League players
People from Blyth, Northumberland
Footballers from Northumberland